Urien, often referred to as Urien Rheged or Uriens, was a late 6th-century king of Rheged, an early British kingdom of the Hen Ogledd (today's northern England and southern Scotland) of the House of Rheged. His power and his victories, including the battles of Gwen Ystrad and Alt Clut Ford, are celebrated in the praise poems to him by Taliesin, preserved in the Book of Taliesin.

In Arthurian legend, he inspired the character of King Urien of either Garlot (Garloth) or Gore (Gorre). His most famous son Owain mab Urien similarly turned into the character of Ywain.

Life
According to the genealogies, Urien was the son of Cynfarch Oer, son of Meirchion Gul, son of Gorwst, son of Cenau, son of Coel Hen (King Cole), the first recorded post-Roman military leader in the area of Hadrian's Wall. He fought against the rulers of the Anglian kingdom of Bernicia (modern Northumbria). An Anglian noble, Ida, had occupied Metcauld around the middle of the 6th century and begun to raid the mainland. Urien joined with other northern kings, Rhydderch Hael "the Generous" of Strathclyde and two other descendants of Coel, Gwallog mab Llaenog and Morgant Bwlch. They defeated the Angles and besieged them on Lindisfarne but, according to the Historia Brittonum, Urien was assassinated at the behest of Morgant Bwlch who was jealous of his power. A man called Llofan Llaf Difo is said to have killed him. One of the Welsh Triads calls the death of Urien one of the "Three Unfortunate Assassinations" and another lists him as one of the "Three Great Battle-leaders of Britain".

He had at least five sons, named Owain, Rhiwallon, Elffin, Rhun 'Baladr Bras' and Pasgen. The eldest of them succeeded him.

Legend
Urien remained a popular figure in Wales over the centuries, and he and his son Owain were incorporated into Arthurian legend as it spread from Britain to continental Europe. His kingdom was eventually transferred to the magical land of Gore (more worldy Garlot in some version), and Kings Lot of Lothian and Auguselus of Scotland are sometimes said to be his brothers. During the reign of Uther Pendragon, Urien marries the young King Arthur's sister (often Morgan le Fay, but sometimes another sister is named, such as Hermesan in the Livre d'Artus and Blasine in Of Arthour and of Merlin). He, like the kings of several other lands, initially opposes Arthur's accession to the throne after Uther's death. Urien and the others rebel against the young monarch, but upon their defeat, the rebels become Arthur's allies and vassals.

His marriage to Morgan is not portrayed as a happy one, however, as in a popular version (also included in Thomas Malory's influential Le Morte d'Arthur) Morgan plots to take Excalibur, kill Urien and Arthur, and place herself and her lover Accolon on the throne (in most tellings, she fails in all parts of that plan, being foiled by their son and by the Lady of the Lake). Malory sometimes spells his name Urience, which has led some (e.g. Alfred Tennyson) to identify him with King Rience.

He is usually said to be the father of Ywain (Owain), or Yvain by Morgan le Fay but many texts also give him a second son, Ywain the Bastard, fathered on his seneschal's wife. Welsh tradition further attributes to him a daughter named Morfydd. According to Roger Sherman Loomis, the name and character of another Arthurian king, Nentres of Garlot could have been derived from that of Urien.

In popular culture
 Urien is mentioned in the 20th-century Welsh awdl Yr Arwr by Hedd Wyn. 
 He is a minor character in Mary Stewart's Merlin Trilogy.
 He appears as Uryens in John Boorman's film Excalibur (1981), depicted as an enemy lord who becomes Arthur's ally and is the one to knight him. 
 He is one of the key characters in Melvyn Bragg's novel Credo (1996) (reprinted as The Sword and the Miracle in the USA), a celebration of the Celtic tradition and its fight against the Northumbrian and Roman (Catholic) incursions.

References

6th-century English monarchs
6th-century Scottish monarchs
6th-century Welsh monarchs
6th-century murdered monarchs
Arthurian characters
Knights of the Round Table
Monarchs of Rheged
Taliesin